Drasteria ochracea is a moth of the family Erebidae. It is found from British Columbia south through the western parts of the United States from Washington south to Arizona.

The wingspan is about 46 mm.

References

External links

Drasteria
Moths described in 1870
Moths of North America